Serafim Karalexis is a film producer. He began as an experimental filmmaker while attending Boston University's School of Fine and Applied Arts. He imported the film "I Am Curious (Yellow)" into the US, which eventually went to the US Supreme Court.  BYRNE v. KARALEXIS [396 U.S. 976] He was responsible for Billy Joel going to the Soviet Union for concerts in Leningrad and Moscow as an HBO Special. He has produced and distributed over 30 films in the US.

Filmography
The Steal (1995) (associate producer)
Anna Pavlova (1983) (associate producer)
Death Promise (1977) (producer) 
The Super Weapon (1976) (producer)    
The Black Dragon's Revenge (1975) (executive producer)
The Black Dragon (1974) (associate producer)
The Real Bruce Lee (1973) (producer)
I Am Curious Yellow (1967) (distributor)
The Punk Rock Movie (1977) (associate producer)
The Death of Bruce Lee (1975) (producer)
Super Weapon (1980) (producer)

External links

Justia https://supreme.justia.com/cases/federal/us/396/976/
The New Yorker https://www.newyorker.com/magazine/1975/02/24/the-black-dragon
Books.Google.com https://books.google.com/books?id=AvOWrZ4WJHwC&pg=PA342&lpg=PA342&dq=serafim+karalexis&source=bl&ots=VKZaXIFRxy&sig=15IZOHnpd2ej7t4_-DL9EDZ5CIQ&hl=en&sa=X&ved=2ahUKEwjZisjkttfeAhVow1kKHV01DKw4FBDoATAEegQIAxAB#v=onepage&q=serafim%20karalexis&f=false

American film producers
American people of Greek descent
Living people
Year of birth missing (living people)